Roy Martin (born 1961) is an English session drummer.

Biography 

Martin was born in Liverpool. Self-taught from a young age, he learnt by playing along to records in his family home. He grew up in Liverpool, playing in bands from his mid teens. He moved to New York City in his early 20s, where he met Ron Saint Germain, a highly established producer who has worked with artists including Muse, Jimi Hendrix, Red Hot Chili Peppers, U2, Whitney Houston and Michael Jackson. After working in New York for an extended period of time, Martin returned to England for the birth of his first child.

Martin has worked with The Zutons, Snowy White (Pink Floyd, Thin Lizzy), Aretha Franklin, Modern English, Jimmy Barnes, David Gray, Patricia Kaas, The Christians, Bono (U2), Regina Belle, Thea Gilmore, Viv Stanshall, Lightning Seeds, Gavin Friday, Roland Gift (Fine Young Cannibals), Russell Watson, Robert Palmer, Pete Wylie, Barclay James HarvestShow of Hands, Black, Shalom Hanoch, Cock Robin, Jack Bruce, Ant and Dec (Pj & Duncan, Oui 3, Nut, Paul Young (Mike + the Mechanics), Sad Café, Diesel, Gerry Thomas (Fatback Band), Elisha La'Verne, Donna McGhee, Johhny Conquest, Mike Peters (The Alarm), Glen Matlock, David Essex, Billy Brannigan, Show of Hands, Ronnie Peterson, Breed 77, Nigel Stonier, Terry Reid (The Rolling Stones, Bonnie Raitt, Fleetwood Mac)
Dave McCabe (The Zutons, Joan Baez, Erin McKeown, Teitur, Athena Andreadis, and many other notable artists.

Other credits 
Martin is also the drummer on this seasons Champions League soundtrack, and FIFA World Cup theme tune.

Endorsement 

Martin has endorsed Paiste Cymbals for many years.

Influences 

Martin's musical influences include Ian Paice, Andy Newmark, Jeff Porcaro and Steve Gadd.

Film soundtrack appearances

Blame It on the Bellboy
End of the Orange Season
Don't Tell Mom the Babysitter's Dead
And Now... Ladies and Gentlemen

Personal life 
Martin is still working and currently lives in England. He is married with two children.

References

External links
Official website
ADC Liverpool: drums and percussion

1961 births
Living people
English drummers
British male drummers
English session musicians